The World Domination Tour was a worldwide concert tour in 1999 and 2000 headlined by Slipknot in support of their first studio album Slipknot. It was their first major headlining tour.

Set list

Tour dates

References
http://www.slipknot-metal.com/main.php?sk=tourography

1999 concert tours
2000 concert tours
Slipknot (band) concert tours